Atomiscala is a genus of sea snails, marine gastropod molluscs in the family Cimidae.

Distribution

Marine

Species
 Atomiscala islandica Warén, 1989
 Atomiscala xenophyes (Melvill & Standen, 1912)

References

Cimidae